Padegan-e Khosrowabad (also Romanized as Pādegān Khosrowābād; also known as Gārdseāḥlī) is a village in Minubar Rural District, Arvandkenar District, Abadan County, Khuzestan Province, Iran. At the 2006 census, its population was 165, in 50 families.

References 

Populated places in Abadan County